The Rungis International Market is the principal market of Paris, mainly for food and horticultural products, located in the commune of Rungis, in the southern suburbs. It is the second largest wholesale food market in the world. The first one is La Central de Abastos, located in Mexico city, with 327 ha.

From its origins in the 10th century to the mid-20th century, the central market of Paris was located in the centre of the city, in a 10-hectare area named Les Halles. That became too small to accommodate all of the business demand, and, in 1969, the market was transferred to the suburbs. Rungis was selected because of its easy access by rail and highway and its proximity to Orly International Airport.

The market is the property of the French State and administered by the Semmaris (Société d'Economie Mixte d'Aménagement et de gestion du marché d'intérêt national de Rungis). Wholesalers are plentiful and the competition is strong. The market starts at 1am and ends around 11am. Clients are professionals, distributors and restaurants. Veterinary, phytosanitary controls and property checkouts are omnipresent. The waste of the market is recycled and the energy generated by the incinerator is used to heat the market and Orly Airport nearby.

On 25 September 2022, the market caught fire.

Statistics 
Data:
13,000 people work there every day;
26,000 vehicles enter every day (of which 3,000 are heavy trucks);
1,698,000 tonnes of products are brought in annually;
it has the largest turnover of wholesale markets in the world.

References

External links
 Official website of the market 
 Official website of the market 
 La page relative à l'économie 

Squares in Paris
Food markets
1969 establishments in France